Ákos Bertalan Apatóczky; born 12 July 1974 in Budapest, Hungary is a Hungarian Sinologist and Mongolist, mostly known for his historical linguistic research on Middle Mongol sources written in Chinese script, currently the Chair of the Department of Chinese Studies at the Institute of Oriental Languages and Cultures (Károli Gáspár University (KRE)) and the leader of the KRE Sinology Research Group in Budapest, Hungary. He is a regular member of Academia Europaea and the secretary of the Committee on Oriental Studies at the Hungarian Academy of Sciences.

Biography
Graduated with honours from the Faculty of Humanities at Eötvös Loránd University Budapest, (MA in Mongol Studies) in 1998. In 2002 he also received an MA in Chinese Studies at with “excellent” result. From 1998 to 2006 Apatóczky worked as a research fellow at the Hungarian Academy of Sciences, Department of Altaic Studies as a “junior researcher” grant fellow. Parallel he taught undergraduate courses in Chinese and Mongolian languages, history and linguistics at the Inner Asian Department, Eötvös Loránd University Budapest. In 2006 he defended his PhD dissertation at the Doctoral School in Linguistic Sciences Eötvös Loránd University. For his thesis ‘Yiyu. The Deciphering of a Sixteenth Century Sino-Mongol Glossary’ on Beilu Yiyu, Apatóczky was awarded a summa cum laude doctoral degree.

Among his most significant achievements are the reconstructed Middle Mongolian linguistic monuments written originally in Chinese script. Next to them he proved that almost the entire lexicon of the Sino-Mongol glossary included in the late Ming military treatise the Lulongsai lüe, the lexicon of which was thought to be the richest among the similar works until recently, was, in fact, copied from other earlier sources. All these sources were identified in his book in 2016, matching every single headword (more than 1.400) of the Lulongsai lüe glossary with its donor works' original headwords.

Next to his position at Károli Gáspár University he was also a guest lecturer at the Department of Altaistics at the University of Szeged from 2017 to 2020. In 2017 the degree of Dr. habil. was conferred for his thesis by the Eötvös Loránd University. The same year he served as the president of the 60th Meeting of the Permanent International Altaistic Conference. He was a recipient of the 2019 "Taiwan Fellowship" grant awarded by the Ministry of Foreign Affairs of the R.O.C. From 2020 he serves as the chair of the then newly established Department of Chinese Studies at the Institute of Oriental Languages and Cultures at his University.

In 2019 he got elected as a regular member of Academia Europaea to the Section of Classics and Oriental Studies. In 2021 the Committee on Oriental Studies at the Hungarian Academy of Sciences elected him as the secretary of the committee.

Works
 Ideas behind symbols - languages behind scripts. SUA vol. 52. University of Szeged, 2019 (ed.)
 Early Mandarin profanity and its Middle Mongolian reflection in the vocabulary of the Wu Bei Zhi (武備志). In: Rocznik Orientalistyczny. 71: (2) pp. 9–38 (2019)
 Philology of the Grasslands. Brill, Leiden, Boston 2018. (co-edited with Christopher. P. Atwood)
 Recent developments on the decipherment of the Khitan Small Script.']' In: Acta Orientalia Academiae Scientiarum Hungaricae. 70: (2) pp. 109–133 (2017) (co-authored with Béla Kempf)
 The Translation Chapter of the Late Ming Lulongsai Lüe. Bilingual Sections of a Chinese Military Collection. Brill, Leiden, Boston 2016.
 Yiyu  (Beilu yiyu ). An indexed critical edition of a 16th century Sino-Mongolian glossary. Global Oriental Publishers, Brill, 2009.
  [Chinese language]. Chinese language textbook, teachers' edition (LITE language school). Budapest, 2011
 Dialectal Traces in Beilu yiyu: The early Mongols: language, culture and history; Studies in honor of Igor de Rachewiltz on the occasion of his 80. birthday. Indiana University Uralic and Altaic series/173, pp. 9–20, 2009.
 És a maradék... [The residue. Study on the history of Chinese mathematics] in: Crystal-Splendour: Essays presented in honour of Professor Kara György's 70th birthday. ELTE, Budapest, 2007.. Research Group for Altaic Studies, Department of Inner Asian Studies, 2007. pp. 25–34. Budapest, 2007.
  [On the question of the subject markers of Mongolian], Wu Xinying 吴新英 and Chen Ganglong 陈岗龙 (ed.): . Minzu publishing house, Beijing, 2005. pp. 322–343
 Yiyu (Beilu yiyu ): A Middle Mongolian glossary of the Dengtan Bijiu (登墰必究). In: Mongolica. Vol. 14 (35). pp. 368–374. Ulaanbaatar, 2004.

Articles intended for the general public
 Schönbrunn kínai szobái [The Chinese rooms of Schönbrunn Palace, Vienna]. csk.blog.hu (website for popularized articles on oriental studies), 2012/12
 Zsoldos Imre 1931–2009 (Obituary) csk.blog.hu, 2009
 Mit mondott Mao? [What did Mao say? Historical essay] csk.blog.hu, 2009
 Randalírozás Mongóliában [Turmoil in Mongolia] In: Magyar Narancs, 2008/28,pp. 23–24
 Lin Piao zuhanása [The fall of Lin Biao. Historical essay] In: Népszabadság (leading daily newspaper of Hungary), 2001. October 2, p. 7
 Merre megy Tajvan? [Which direction is Taiwan going?] In: 168 óra, 2000. May 25. pp. 40–41
 Újkori mongoljárás [A new Mongol invasion] In: Új Keleti Szemle [New Oriental Review], 1998/1: pp. 55–58
 Illatos kikötő [The fragrant port. Political essay] In: Selyemút, August 1997, pp. 24–26
 Éhes tigris [Hungry tiger. Political essay] In: Selyemút, May 1997, pp. 27–30

Film and multimedia
 2015 translation of the Taiwanese documentary ’Yellow box’
 2005 2005 translation of the Taiwanese movie ‘A One and a Two’ (一一)
 2003 translation of the Hongkongese movie ’So close’
 2003 specialist adviser for the translation of the Chinese movie ’The Hero’

Honours
 
 2019 Elected Member of the Academia Europaea (The Academy of Europe)

Memberships[https://www.ae-info.org/ae/Member/Apat%C3%B3czky_%C3%81kos_Bertalan Academia Europaea (The Academy of Europe) (ordinary member)Committee on Oriental Studies at the Hungarian Academy of Sciences (Secretary)International Journal of Eurasian Linguistics (BRILL) (member of the editorial board)Languages of Asia (BRILL) (member of the editorial board)European Association for Chinese Studies (member)American Association for Chinese Studies (member) President of the Permanent International Altaistic Conference (2017)International Association of Chinese Linguistics (member)Societas Uralo-Altaica (member)Hungarian Society of Linguistics (member)Public body of the Hungarian Academy of Sciences (member)Alexander Csoma de Kőrös Society (member)Doctoral School in Linguistics, University of Szeged (inspector)Károli Gáspár University, Doctoral School of History (supervisor, inspector)Eötvös Loránd University of Sciences, Doctoral School of Philosophy (supervisor, inspector)University of Szeged, Doctoral School of History'' (inspector)

See also
List of Sinologists

References

External links
 Biography of Ákos Bertalan Apatóczky at the website of Károli Gáspár University (http://www.kre.hu/btk/index.php/apatoczky-akos-bertalan)
 Ákos Bertalan Apatóczky's personal page at the Academia Europae website (https://www.ae-info.org/ae/Member/Apat%C3%B3czky_%C3%81kos_Bertalan)
 The Secret History of Akos – (http://english.cri.cn/2237/2005-3-29/81@222068.htm)

1974 births
Living people
Hungarian sinologists
Mongolists
Hungarian translators
Academic staff of the Károli Gáspár University of the Reformed Church in Hungary